Botswana is a landlocked country located in Southern Africa, north of South Africa. Much of the population of Botswana is concentrated in the eastern part of the country.

Sunshine totals are high all year round although winter is the sunniest period. The whole country is windy and dusty during the dry season.

Geography
The land is predominantly flat to gently undulating tableland, although there is some hilly country, where mining is carried out. The Kalahari Desert is in the central and the southwest. The Okavango Delta, one of the world's largest inland deltas, is in the northwest and the Makgadikgadi Pans, a large salt pan lies in the north-central area. The Makgadikgadi has been established as an early habitation area for primitive man; This large seasonal wetland is composed of several large component pans, the largest being Nwetwe Pan, Sua Pan and Nxai Pan.
The country is divided into four drainage regions, which are sometimes indistinct due to the arid nature of the climate:
 the Chobe River on the border with the Caprivi Strip of Namibia together with a small adjacent swampy area is part of the Zambezi basin;
 most of the north and central region of the country is part of the Okavango inland drainage basin;
 the easternmost part of the country falls into the Limpopo drainage basin;
 the southern and southwestern regions, which are the driest of all, are drained by the Molopo river along the South African border and the Nossob river through the Kalahari Gemsbok National Park, and are technically part of the basin of the Orange River. None of these rivers normally flows as far as the Orange, however. (The last recorded confluence was in the 1880s.)
Except for the Chobe, Okavango, Boteti and Limpopo rivers, most of Botswana's rivers cease to flow during the dry and early rainy seasons.

Climate
Botswana is semi-arid, due to the short rain season. However, the relatively high altitude of the country and its continental situation gives it a subtropical climate. The country is remote from moisture-laden air flows for most of the year. The dry season lasts from April to October in the south and to November in the north where, however, rainfall totals are higher. Sunshine totals are high all year round although winter is the sunniest period. The whole country is windy and dusty during the dry season.

Natural hazards
Botswana is affected by periodic droughts, and seasonal August winds blow from the west, carrying sand and dust, which can obscure visibility.

Environment
Current environmental issues in Botswana are overgrazing, desertification and the existence of only limited fresh water resources.

Research from scientists has found that the common practice of overstocking cattle to cope with drought losses actually depletes scarce biomass, making ecosystems more vulnerable. The study of the district predicts that by 2050 the cycle of mild drought is likely to become shorter —18 months instead of two years—due to climate change.

International agreements
Botswana is a party to the following international agreements: Biodiversity, Climate Change, Desertification, Endangered Species, Hazardous Wastes, Law of the Sea, Nuclear Test Organization, Ozone Layer Protection and Wetlands.

Extreme points 

This is a list of the extreme points of Botswana, the points that are farther north, south, east or west than any other location.

 Northernmost point – the border with Zambia upon the Zambezi River at Chobe District
 Easternmost point – the tripoint with South Africa and Zimbabwe, Central District
 Southernmost point – Bokspits, Kgalagadi District
 Westernmost point – the western section of the border with Namibia*
 note: Botswana does not have a westernmost point as the western section is formed by the 22nd meridian of longitude east of Greenwich.

References 

 
Climate change in Botswana